Tim Berry may refer to:

 Tim Berry (politician) (born 1961), American politician in Indiana
 Tim Berry (entrepreneur) (born 1948), American entrepreneur and author